Boquhapple is an area in Stirling council area, Scotland near Thornhill.

References

Stirling (council area)